Kitty in a Casket is a female-fronted Austrian punk rock/rock'n'roll band from Vienna formed in 2008. The band consists of vocalist Kitty Casket, guitarists Billy the Bat and Todd Flash, bassist Marc Maniac and drummer Max van Angst. Their sound can be described as a combination of the typical 'in your face' punk rock sound, rock'n'roll riffs and spooky but fun lyrics.

History 
The band released their first full-length studio album "Horror Express" in 2009, followed by their four track sold-out EP "HalloWien" soon after. In 2011 they released their 2nd album "Back to Thrill". The band's third studio album "Bittersweet" was released on Better Than Hell Records in the spring of 2013 in both Europe and the US, proving an international success.

The latest studio album "Kiss & Hell" was released in February 2016 in cooperation with renowned German record label Rodeostar/SPV. The tagline "Punk Rock, Lady Style" is probably the best way of describing the sound, energy and soul of the new record.

Kitty in a Casket have been touring around Europe in support of their albums playing club shows and major festivals such as the "WGT - Wave Gotik Treffen" and "Back to Future" in Germany, "Nova Rock" in Austria, "Whitby Goth Weekend" in the U.K., "Psychobilly Meeting" in Spain, "Fiesta du Rock" and "Sjock" in Belgium, "Warhead Fest" in Poland, "Club Sin" in Finland and "Pod Parou" in the Czech Republic, to name a few.

They have also shared the stage with The Exploited, The Other (band), Betontod, Die Kassierer, Dead Kennedys, The Bones, Guana Batz, Mad Sin, V8 Wankers, Tiger Army, The Creepshow and many more. The band also embarked on a 5-week US tour in the summer of 2013 promoting "Bittersweet" overseas by playing 27 concerts across the States. They returned for a second US West Coast tour in autumn of 2016, and played their very first U.K. Halloween tour soon after.

Members 
 Kitty Casket – vocals
 Billy The Bat – guitar
 Todd Flash - guitar
 Marc Maniac - bass / upright bass
 Max Van Angst – drums

Discography

Albums

Music videos

External links 
  
 
 Profile at Vk.com
 Music at last.fm

Austrian punk rock groups
Horror punk groups
Psychobilly groups